Podocarpus National Park is a national park located in the provinces of Zamora Chinchipe and Loja, in the south-east of Ecuador.  It was created in 1982.

It covers 1462.80 km2, from two spurs of the eastern range of the Andes to the basins of the Nangaritza, Numbala, and Loyola rivers. About 85% of the park is in the province of Zamora Chinchipe, and the remainder is in the province of Loja. It is categorized as a megadiverse zone and an area with a high level of endemic species because it is a meeting point between four ecological systems: Northern Andes, Southern Andes, Amazonian, and Pacific. Although considerable knowledge has been gathered about its biodiversity in parts of the area, only a minority of the species inhabiting the park has been discovered so far.

The Podocarpus National Park spans from lower montane rain forests at about 1000 metres elevation, up to high elevation elfin forests at 3000 metres. Paramo or subparamo vegetation is found at elevations above 3000 metres where a complex of more than 100 lagoons exists, among the best-known being the Lagunas del Compadre.

The park has two main entrances. One is in the Cajanuma Sector, about 8 km south of Loja, where elfin forest and paramo habitats at elevations between some 2900 and 3500 metres can be accessed. The other is in the Bombuscaro Sector, corresponding to the Bombuscaro River, in lower montane forest habitats at elevations from roughly 1000 metres upwards.  There are two alternative entrances without park guards. The Romerillos Sector, corresponding to the Jamboé River southeast of the Bombuscaro Sector, is also an entrance for gold miners who work inside the park. Another entrance is at Cerro Toledo, east of the Yangana-Valladolid route in the southwestern part of the park.

Flora
The park contains an exceptionally diverse flora, and has been considered the 'Botanical Garden of America'. Its high and low mountain-forest ecosystems, located in the Nudo de Sabanilla pass, and its very humid mountain and premontane forests in the basin of the Numbala River, have more than 4,000 species of plants including trees that can measure up to 40 meters, like the romerillo (Podocarpus glomeratus) which gives its name to the park, and many other valuable species like the Cinchona - the national tree of Ecuador - and a huge variety of orchids.

Among the main species found in the region are chilca (Baccharis sp.), laurel, San Pedro cactus, uvilla, black elder, pumamaqui (Oreopanax sp.), sappanwood, arrayán, cashoco, alder, acacia, sage, guato blanco, cedar, castor oil plant, walnut, yumbingue (Terminalia guyanensis) and canelón (Swartzia littlei).

Fauna
So far, 68 species of mammals have been recorded in the park and its surroundings; four of them are on Ecuador's "Red List" as either endangered or vulnerable:
 Mountain tapir (Tapirus pinchaque)
 Spectacled bear (Tremarctos ornatus)
 Northern pudu (Pudu mephistophiles)
 Jaguar (Panthera onca)
Other notable mammals include:
 Amazonian hog-nosed skunk (Conepatus semistriatus)
 Common grey shrew opossum (Caenolestes fuliginosus)

There are 560 registered species of birds, which accounts for 6% of all birds registered worldwide and 40% of the birds registered in Ecuador. For this reason it was identified in 1995 by Wedge and Long as one of the important areas for the conservation of neotropic birds.

The area has also been identified as a diversity hotspot of insects such as geometrid moths. So far, 1,266 species of this family have been recorded in the northern part of the park and adjacent montane forests, a number exceeding any other place in the world.

Tourist information
The city of Loja is nearby, approximately 25–90 minutes from the two major entrances of Cajanuma and Bombuscaro. There are three guided trails that take from 15 minutes (Speckled Bear Trail) to 1 hour and 20 minutes (Cloud Forest Trail).  There are longer trails for those who prefer to backpack or camp. Visitors can also enter from Vilcabamba and Zamora, which are both located directly next to the national park.

Climate
The rainy season varies throughout the park.  In the east the rainy season is March - July, while in the west the rainy season is October - December.  The mean temperature at high elevations is 12 °C  (54 °F) while in the lower parts of the park it is 18 °C (64 °F).

External links

References

National parks of Ecuador
Biosphere reserves of Ecuador
Protected areas established in 1982
Geography of Loja Province
Geography of Zamora-Chinchipe Province
Tourist attractions in Loja Province
Tourist attractions in Zamora-Chinchipe Province
1982 establishments in Ecuador